High definition or HD may refer to:

Visual technologies 
HD DVD, discontinued optical disc format
HD Photo, former name for the JPEG XR image file format
HDV, format for recording high-definition video onto magnetic tape
HiDef, 24 frames-per-second digital video format
High-Definition Multimedia Interface (HDMI), all-digital audio/video interface capable of transmitting uncompressed streams
High-definition television (HDTV), television signals and apparatus with higher resolution than their contemporary counterparts
Ultra-high-definition television, a further step in television resolution
High-definition video, used in HDTV broadcasting, digital film, computer HD video file formats, and video games

Audio technologies 
Dolby TrueHD, lossless audio compression codec
DTS-HD Master Audio, lossless audio compression codec
High Definition Compatible Digital, discontinued digital audio optical disc format
 High-definition audio, general marketing term for high fidelity audio products and services
 Intel High Definition Audio, 2004 Intel specification for hardware and associated drivers for Personal computer audio
 Wideband audio, also known as HD voice, is high definition voice quality for telephony audio

Music 
"Hi-Definition", 2008 single from Lupe Fiasco's The Cool
 High Definition (Joe Morris album), 2008
 High Definition (Shootyz Groove album), 1999
"High Definition", a single from Waterparks' 2019 album, Fandom

Other 
 High Definition (radio program), 2006 Canadian radio program
 High-definition map, used in autonomous driving